This article refers to crime in the U.S. state of Georgia.

Statistics
In the period between 1877 and 1950, the state was the site of at least 586 lynchings of black people, the most of any state.

In 2008, there were 434,560 crimes reported in Georgia, including 650 murders, 387,009 property crimes, and 2,344 rapes.

Capital punishment laws

Capital punishment is applied in this state. Up until 2009, juvenile offenders could be charged as adults for crimes called the seven deadly sins.

See also 
 Crime in Atlanta
 Gangs in Georgia
 Law of Georgia (U.S. state)

References